Zuzana Neckářová (born 29 June 1984) is a Czech professional racing cyclist. Neckářová represented her country in the time trial at the 2015 European Games in Baku, Azerbaijan. Having finished second in the Czech National Road Race Championships, she also rode in the women's road race at the 2015 UCI Road World Championships.

References

External links

1984 births
Living people
Czech female cyclists
People from Kraslice
Cyclists at the 2015 European Games
European Games competitors for the Czech Republic